The Kern Mountains are a mountain range primarily on the eastern edge of White Pine County, Nevada, United States, but extending slightly east into western Juab County, Utah.

Description
The range lies between the Antelope Valley on the northwest, the South Mountains and the Pleasant Valley on the northeast, the Snake Valley on the east and south, the Snake Range on the south, and the Spring Valley on the west.

See also

 List of mountain ranges of Nevada
 List of mountain ranges of Utah

References

Mountain ranges of Nevada
Mountain ranges of Utah
Mountain ranges of White Pine County, Nevada
Mountain ranges of Juab County, Utah